Lepteucosma huebneriana is a species of moth of the family Tortricidae. It is found in China (Hebei, Jilin, Heilongjiang, Henan, Zhejiang, Anhui, Fujian, Hubei, Hunan, Guangdong, Guangxi, Guizhou), Korea, Japan, Russia and Europe, where it has been recorded from France, Liechtenstein, Germany, Austria, Switzerland, Italy, the Czech Republic, Slovakia, Slovenia, Hungary, Romania, Latvia and Lithuania.

The wingspan is 13–15 mm.

The larvae feed on Rubus fruticosus, Rubus crataegifolius, Rubus sachalinensis and Lycium chinense.

References

Moths described in 1980
Eucosmini